Phrynobatrachus latifrons, the Ahl's river frog or savanna puddle frog, is a species of frog in the family Phrynobatrachidae. It is found from Senegal in West Africa east to northern Cameroon and eastern Chad in western Central Africa. The IUCN Red List includes the following West African countries (in alphabetic order): Benin, Burkina Faso, Ivory Coast, Gambia, Ghana, Guinea, Liberia, Mali, Nigeria, Senegal, Sierra Leone, and Togo.

Etymology
The common name of this species refers to its describer, German zoologist Ernst Ahl. The formerly recognized Phrynobatrachus vogti, or Vogt's river frog, is named for Theodor Vogt (1881–1932), a German naturalist.

Description
Phrynobatrachus latifrons are short-lived frogs that reach sexual maturity at the age of 4–5 months and live only for further two months. They are characterized by moderate webbing in their toes (also considered well-developed), absence of eyelid spine, lack of enlarged discs of finger and toes, and a yellow throat in breeding males.

Habitat and conservation
Phrynobatrachus latifrons is an extremely common species. It inhabits wooded and open savanna, secondary forest, degraded former forest, agricultural areas, and inselbergs in rainforest, but avoids closed primary rainforest. It breeds in temporary ponds, puddles, and roadside ditches. There are no significant threats to this very adaptable species.

Notes

References

latifrons
Frogs of Africa
Amphibians of Cameroon
Vertebrates of Chad
Amphibians of Sub-Saharan Africa
Amphibians of West Africa
Taxa named by Ernst Ahl
Amphibians described in 1924
Taxonomy articles created by Polbot